Yucca luminosa, more commonly referred to as its synonym Yucca rigida, is a plant species in the yucca genus native to northern Mexico. It is also commonly called silver-leaf yucca, blue yucca, and rigid blue yucca.

References

  

luminosa
Plants described in 1902
Flora of Durango
Flora of Chihuahua (state)
Flora of Coahuila